Kani Kechkineh (also Romanized as Kānī Kechkīneh) is a village in Badr Rural District, in the Central District of Ravansar County, Kermanshah Province, Iran. At the 2006 census, its population was 89, in 23 families.

References 

Populated places in Ravansar County